Come On Live Long is an Irish folk-electronica band based in Dublin.

Career
Come On Live Long were founded in 2010. Vocalist Louise Gaffney named Kanye West, Stars of the Lid and Max Richter as inspirations.

Their second album, In The Still, was nominated for the Choice Music Prize in 2017.

Personnel

 Robert Ardiff (vocals, ukelele, guitar)
Louise Gaffney (vocals, keyboard)
 Steve Battle (drums, percussion)
David O’Connor (guitar, synth, samples)
Ken McCabe (bass)

Discography

Albums
Everything Fall (2013)
In The Still (2017)

EPs

Mender (2011)
Come On Live Long EP (2012)

References

External links 
Come On Live Long on Bandcamp

Musical groups from Dublin (city)
Irish folk musical groups
2010 establishments in Ireland